The Failure is a 1917 British silent crime film directed by Henry Edwards and starring Edwards, Chrissie White and Lionelle Howard.

Cast
 Henry Edwards - Dick Carson
 Chrissie White - Margaret Gilder
 Lionelle Howard - Sidney Carson
 Fred Johnson - Gustave le Sage
 Charles Vane - Police Chief
 W.G. Saunders - Mr. Gilder

References

External links

1917 films
British silent feature films
1917 crime drama films
1910s English-language films
Films directed by Henry Edwards
British crime drama films
Hepworth Pictures films
British black-and-white films
1910s British films
Silent crime drama films